Herbert Dörner (14 July 1930 - 26 March 1991) was a German international footballer who played for Preußen Dellbrück, 1. FC Köln and Bonner SC.

External links
 
 

1930 births
1991 deaths
Association football midfielders
German footballers
Germany international footballers
1. FC Köln players
West German footballers
Footballers from Cologne